Danjaq, LLC (formerly Danjaq S.A. and Danjaq, Inc.) is the holding company responsible for the copyright and trademarks to the characters, elements, and other material related to James Bond on screen. It is currently owned and managed by the family of Albert R. Broccoli, the co-initiator of the popular film franchise.

History

Founding
Danjaq S.A. was founded by Albert R. Broccoli and Harry Saltzman after the release of the first James Bond film Dr. No, in 1962, to ensure all future films in the series. The new company was to be called Danjaq, a combination of Broccoli and Saltzman's respective wives' names (Dana Broccoli and Jacqueline Saltzman). The company was originally domiciled in the Canton of Vaud in Switzerland, hence the appearance of "S.A." letters in the first legal name of the company. In 1962, Danjaq began its association with United Artists.

Ownership
Due to a series of failed business interests, Harry Saltzman's personal financial difficulties forced him to sell his 50% share of Danjaq to United Artists in 1975.

In 1986, Albert and Dana Broccoli acquired United Artists' 50% stake in the company and so assumed complete control of Danjaq. John Cork claims that in exchange for the sale, MGM/UA received an exclusive distribution deal with Danjaq that is far more lucrative than when the shares were originally owned by Broccoli and Saltzman.

Danjaq's legal domicile was changed from Switzerland to Delaware in October 1992. The Delaware company’s legal name was Danjaq, Inc. The company was converted to a limited liability company in January 1997. In 1999, as part of a settlement of a lawsuit between MGM and Sony, Sony acquired MGM's interest in the Spider-Man film rights, while Danjaq bought out the rights to the novel Casino Royale.

Following the death of Albert Broccoli in 1996 and Dana Broccoli in 2004, control of Danjaq was passed to Michael G. Wilson.

Copyright status
Although the trademarks for material related to the Bond films are held by Danjaq, the copyrights to the first 20 film properties are co-owned by Danjaq LLC and Metro-Goldwyn-Mayer Studios (the technical successor to subsidiary United Artists). The  copyrights to Casino Royale, Quantum of Solace, Skyfall and Spectre, are shared between Danjaq LLC, MGM, and Columbia Pictures Industries, Inc.

Films made outside the control of Danjaq
Two Bond films have been made outside the control of Danjaq, the first was the 1967 film Casino Royale, with David Niven as Bond; the second was the 1983 film Never Say Never Again, a remake of Thunderball. Never Say Never Again was the result of a legal dispute involving Kevin McClory, one of the credited co-writers of the story used for the novel Thunderball, who was awarded the film rights to the novel in a 1963 settlement with Ian Fleming.

Litigation

Danjaq LLC v. James Bond Ltd
On 13 July 2009, Danjaq applied under s.69(1)(b) of the Companies Act 2006 for a change of name of James Bond Ltd, which had been registered since 12 June 2009. James Bond Ltd was ordered by the adjudicator at the Company Names Tribunal to change its name and to not register another company with an offending name. The respondent was also ordered to contribute toward Danjaq's costs.

References

External links 
 Information about Danjaq and Eon Productions at Eon's website
 Danjaq LLC v. Sony Corp., 263 F.3d 942 (9th Cir. 2001)

James Bond
Holding companies of the United States
Companies based in Santa Monica, California
1962 establishments in California
Holding companies established in 1962
Film production companies of the United States
American film studios
Mass media companies established in 1962
American companies established in 1962